The Auxiliary Force (India) (AFI) was a part-time, paid volunteer military organisation within the British Indian Army, with recruits from British India. Its units were entirely made up of European and Anglo-Indian personnel. The AFI was formed in 1920, along with the Indian Territorial Force (ITF), replacing the Indian Defence Force (IDF).

History
The AFI was created by the Auxiliary Force Act 1920 to replace the unpopular British section of the Indian Defence Force (IDF), which had recruited by conscription. By contrast, the AFI was an all-volunteer force modelled after the British Territorial Army. The Indian parallel to the AFI was the Indian Territorial Force (ITF) which was composed of British officers and Indian other ranks.

Units on 3 September 1939

In popular culture
The Auxiliary Force features extensively in the plot of John Masters' novel Bhowani Junction, focusing on a community of Anglo-Indian railway workers at an Indian town in 1946, on the verge of the British withdrawal.

Footnotes

Military of British India